Susanne Elisabeth Wuest (born September 26, 1979) is an Austrian actress.

Career
Initially a piano enthusiast as a child, Wuest has since carved out a career in film. She appeared as the vampire Lisa in the web-series, Judas Goat for the Edinburgh film company, Seventh Crow. It was a 5 part mini-series that then went on to win several Scottish film awards. Her leading roles in films include Antares and Goodnight Mommy.

Selected filmography

References

External links

Official site

Austrian film actresses
1979 births
Living people